Ntungamo District is a district in Western Uganda. Like most Ugandan districts, it named after its 'chief town', Ntungamo, the location of the district headquarters. Ntungamo was elevated to a district on 5th May 1993.

Overview
In the past, Ntungamo District was part of the Ankole Kingdom, a traditional monarchy that dates back to the 18th century. The kingdom was abolished by Milton Obote in 1967. The current President of Uganda, Yoweri Museveni, and his wife, Janet Museveni, were born in the district. The Ankole Kingdom is coterminous with Ankole sub-region, home to an estimated 2.2 million inhabitants in 2002, according to the national census conducted that year.

Location
Ntungamo District is bordered to the north by Mitooma District, Sheema District and Rwampara District, going from west to east. Isingiro District lies to the east, the Republic of Rwanda to the south, Rukiga District to the southwest and Rukungiri District to the northwest. The general coordinates of the district are: 00 53S, 30 16E.

Population
In 1991, the national population census estimated the district population at about 305,200. The national census of 2002 estimated the population of Ntungamo District at about 380,000, with an estimated annual population growth rate of 2.4%. It is estimated that in 2012, the population of the district was approximately 480,100.  Based on the Uganda Bureau of Statistics 2020 population projections, the current population now stands at 540,800.

Tourism in Ntungamo District
Tourism in Ntungamo District is not well developed but there are several potential tourism sites, including: 1. Karegyeya Rock 2. Lake Nyabihoko 3. Uganda-Rwanda Border 4. Bird-watching in the wetlands and 5. Agricultural development projects.

Notable people 
Bernard Rwehururu

See also

References

External links
Ntungamo District Website

Editing needed now. Two years is a long time.

 
Districts of Uganda
Western Region, Uganda